The International Slavery Museum is a museum located in Liverpool, England that focuses on the history and legacy of the transatlantic slave trade. The museum which forms part of the Merseyside Maritime Museum, consists of three main galleries which focus on the lives of people in West Africa, their eventual enslavement, and their continued fight for freedom. Additionally the museum discusses slavery in the modern day as well as topics on racism and discrimination.

History
Originally part of the Merseyside Maritime Museum which opened in 1980, the history of the slave trade was originally discussed as part of the city's maritime history shortly before a dedicated Transatlantic Slavery gallery was created in 1994 to better explore Liverpool's historic role in the slave trade. By the early 2000s international interest in the exhibition and a high volume of visitors led to the decision for a museum specially dedicated to the history of slavery to be set up so as to better explain slavery and its legacy.

The new museum opened on 23 August 2007, the date of the annual International Day for the Remembrance of the Slave Trade and its Abolition marking the beginning of the slave uprising in Saint-Domingue. The year 2007 was particularly significant as it was the bicentenary of the United Kingdom's Slave Trade Act of 1807, which abolished the slave trade (though not slavery itself) inside the British Empire. The Merseyside Maritime Museum used to house a Transatlantic Slavery Gallery. Phase 1 of the International Slavery Museum involved relocating current exhibitions to the third floor of the museum and adding new displays, which doubled the space dedicated to the subject.  

New displays incorporate the latest historical research but also cover wider issues of the legacy of transatlantic slavery, and its contemporary relevance. Topics such as freedom and identity, social justice and human rights, underdevelopment in Africa and the Caribbean, racial discrimination and injustice and the transformation of European, African and American cultures as a result of slavery.

The East Gallery features approximately 400 annotated songs pertaining to the experience of slavery and the music of Africa and the slave-descended African diaspora.

National Museums Liverpool say the new gallery focuses on the experience of individuals, using the narratives of enslaved and those involved in the trade. They include a shrine to the ancestors of the enslaved as a quiet area for contemplation and reflection.

The second phase planned is the development of a new visitor-focused resource centre with an events programme of performance, public lectures and debate. The centre will have a research facility for visiting scholars to work and access to National Museums Liverpool's archive collections. A digital archive of material related to the transatlantic slave trade will be available.

To enable phase two of the project National Museums Liverpool has acquired the former Dock Traffic Office, which adjoins the Maritime Museum. The two buildings are to be linked.  The Dock Traffic building was formerly occupied by ITV's Granada Television.

The museum was awarded £50,000 in March 2018 to buy and restore the painting 'Am Not I A Man and a Brother'. The painting dates from around 1800 and is based upon a design commissioned by the Committee for the Abolition of the Slave Trade. The image is considered to be one of the first instances of a logo designed for a political cause, and was used on the pottery of Josiah Wedgwood.

Exhibitions
There is a section about life and culture in West Africa before the transatlantic slave trade, the history of slavery and also displays and special exhibitions about the legacies of slavery and current human rights issues.

See also
Slavery museum (France)
Whitney Plantation Historic District (USA)
Barbary slave trade

References

Bibliography
Daniel Brown, "Songs of Slavery", Index on Censorship, Volume 36, Number 1, 2007, p. 138–140.

External links
International Slavery Museum
National Museums Liverpool
Sculpture marks abolition of slave trade anniversary
Guardian article on the opening of phase 1

National Museums Liverpool
Museums in Liverpool
History museums in Merseyside
Museums established in 2007
2007 establishments in England
Slavery museums